Hans van Wijnen (30 December 1937 – 25 January 1995) was a Dutch volleyball player. He competed in the men's tournament at the 1964 Summer Olympics.

References

1937 births
1995 deaths
Dutch men's volleyball players
Olympic volleyball players of the Netherlands
Volleyball players at the 1964 Summer Olympics
Sportspeople from Voorburg